Amita is a brand of fruit juices, nectars and drinks that is available in Greece and Albania. Amita has been a subsidiary brand of Coca-Cola since its release in Greece in 1983.

References

Drink companies of Greece
Coca-Cola brands